Engschrift is a condensed or "narrow" form of the DIN 1451 standard typeface. It is used in a modified form for road signage in Austria.

Use in Austria

Austria uses the transformed font from the German counterpart DIN 1451 Engschrift font. Scripture is officially used as the standard font for traffic signs in Austria. Since 2010 text TERN is used, which dates back to the EU regulations. But for the most part is used in place names in Austria - as well as the previous font Engschrift was specifically designed. Because the existing road signs are replaced prematurely, Austria will continue to use the base font on all roads .
New font that should be used throughout the EU, the font Schrift "Tern", according to experts, the test is easier to read and thus prevent accidents.

New road signs font Tern is a result of the EU project, which was developed policy of uniform road signs in Europe. The project was funded by the Austrian Fund for road safety. Tern has been proven in many tests and readability decreased in comparison with the other fonts used in Europe as the winner. Danube University Krems has made a test lab with 98 vehicle operators. This font has been verified as the best 20 languages (including Greek). Although the EU directive should not be missed in the Austrian Extra solutions. Due to the length of names (example: "Sierninghofen"), a private Schrift Engschrift was on these long names developed.

References 
 

Sans-serif typefaces
DIN standards
Transport in Austria